Dolce, the Italian word for 'sweet', may refer to:

Places
Dolcè, a municipality in Italy
Dolce (Plzeň-South District), a municipality and village in the Czech Republic
Dolce, a village and part of Jesenice (Příbram District) in the Czech Republic

People 

 Dolce (surname)
 Dolce dell'Anguillara (1401–1449), Italian condottiero
 Dolce Ann Cabot (1862–1943), New Zealand journalist

Music 
Dolce (music), to play sweetly
Dolce (album), a 2008 album by J-Pop artist Ami Suzuki

Other 
Dolce (satellite television), Romanian satellite television provider
DOLCE, acronym for "Descriptive Ontology for Linguistic and Cognitive Engineering"
Dolce Hotels and Resorts, founded by Andy Dolce in 1981 in Houston, Texas
"Dolce" (Hannibal), an episode of the television series Hannibal

See also 
Dolce Vita (disambiguation)
Dolci (disambiguation), plural of dolce
Dulce (disambiguation)